The Upper Chapin Street Historic District is a residential historic district on Chapin Street in Southbridge, Massachusetts.  The district includes fourteen Victorian houses on Chapin Street, thirteen of which lie between Forest Avenue and Dresser Street, and two of which are just south of Forest.  All of these houses, almost all of which were built in the 1870s, are well preserved, making it one of the most intact period neighborhoods in the city.

Most of the houses in the district are relatively small cottage-style houses, either 1.5 or two stories, with Italianate and Gothic Revival style decoration.  There is one house in the district with Queen Anne styling, and two in the Stick style.  Only one property, 132 Chapin Street, does not contribute to the district.  The district was added to the National Register of Historic Places in 1989.

See also
National Register of Historic Places listings in Southbridge, Massachusetts
National Register of Historic Places listings in Worcester County, Massachusetts

References

Historic districts in Southbridge, Massachusetts
Historic districts on the National Register of Historic Places in Massachusetts
Queen Anne architecture in Massachusetts
Gothic Revival architecture in Massachusetts
Italianate architecture in Massachusetts
National Register of Historic Places in Southbridge, Massachusetts